Hekima College is a Jesuit school of theology in Nairobi, Kenya, affiliated with the Catholic University of Eastern Africa. It opened in 1984 as a seminary for Jesuits studying to be priests. Since its opening, Hekima has diversified its student base. In 2004 it opened the Institute of Peace Studies and International Relations (HIPSIR).

Overview
Founded upon traditional Jesuit educational principles, Hekima University College caters for the needs of men and women seeking to take their place in and contribute to the evangelising mission of the Church in variety of ministries.

Since 2015 the undergraduate theology programme has served a large spectrum of students, including lay women and men, and individuals from fourteen other religious congregations. The College's HIPSIR initiative was accredited by the Commission for University Education since 2007 and continues to extend its outreach.

Hekima also hosts the Jesuit Historical Institute in Africa (JHIA), organised in 2010 and dedicated in part to preserving the record of Jesuit missionary involvement in Africa.

Academics
Hekima College began as the English-speaking Jesuit theologate in Sub-Saharan Africa for Jesuits studying for the priesthood, offering the same courses and programmes to lay women and men.

Programmes 

 Bachelor of Theology (BTh): this program satisfies the requirements for the Bachelor of Sacred Theology Degree (STB) as set down in the Apostolic Constitution of Pope John Paul II, Sapientia Christiana, as well as the requirements for the Degree of Bachelor of Arts in Theology of the Catholic University of Eastern Africa.
 Post-Graduate Diploma in Pastoral Theology

Courses 

 Lay Theological Formation
 Ignatian Directed Retreat
 Directed Retreat
 Certificate in Management
 Certificate in Catholic Social Thought & Peacebuilding
 Certificate in Post-conflict Transformation

Awards and Prizes 
Hekima University College awards an annual prize for Excellence in Preaching in honor of the acclaimed American theologian and author, Frederick Buechner. Additionally, the College has regularly distributed copies of Buechner's works among its students.

Hekima Institute of Peace Studies and International Relations (HIPSIR) 
In 2004 Hekima inaugurated the Hekima Institute of Peace Studies and International Relations (HIPSIR). It offers a Master of Arts degree (MA) in conflict resolution and transitional justice in post-colonial Africa, as well as certificate courses in related topics. It also sponsors conferences and forums bringing together experts from across the continent and from abroad.

The institute's mission is "to build a society where human dignity is respected, human rights promoted, faith and justice upheld, economic and natural resources shared equitably, international relations founded on principles that promote and respect human life, individuals and institution in power are held accountable, and academic excellence is pursued with the aim of achieving full human potential for good."

HIPSIR publishes HIPSIR Newsletter and The Peace Dialogue.

Student life

Mentorship programme 
Since its founding, the Ignatian concept of cura personalis (the care of the whole person) has been central to the mentorship programme at Hekima. Students are accompanied through their respective programmes by an academic advisor.

Spiritual activities 
Hekima College is founded on the Ignatian Spirituality. The College has historically endeavoured to promote Ignatian principles. Since its founding the Eucharist has been celebrated twice daily throughout the week, and College Mass every Wednesday.

Sports and clubs 
The various sports engaged in by Hekima students have included football, basketball, volleyball, and table tennis. Historically there are several annual sports competitions, including a competition between current students and freshmen, and a competition between Jesuit and non-Jesuit students.

See also
 List of Jesuit sites

References

Universities and colleges in Kenya
Jesuit universities and colleges
Educational institutions established in 1984
Transitional justice
1984 establishments in Kenya